Edmund George Hornby (1799–1865) was a British politician who was MP for Warrington between 1832 and 1835. He was the son of Edmund Hornby.

References

1799 births
1865 deaths
Members of the Parliament of the United Kingdom for English constituencies
UK MPs 1832–1835